TV Tropes is a wiki website that collects and documents descriptions and examples of plot conventions and devices, which it refers to as tropes, within many creative works. Since its establishment in 2004, the site has shifted focus from covering various tropes to those in general media, toys, writings, and their associated fandoms, as well as some non-media subjects such as history, geography, and politics. The nature of the site as a provider of commentary on pop culture and fiction has attracted attention and criticism from several web personalities and blogs.

From April 2008 until July 2012, TV Tropes published free content. In July 2012, TV Tropes modified its license to allow only non-commercial distribution of its content but continued to host the prior submissions under a new distribution license.

The TV Tropes website runs on its own wiki engine software, a heavily modified version of PmWiki, but is not open source. Before October 2010, it was possible to edit anonymously. Registration is now mandatory for all other activities besides viewing the website.

History 

TV Tropes was founded in 2004 by a programmer under the pseudonym "Fast Eddie." He described himself as having become interested in the conventions of genre fiction while studying at MIT in the 1970s and after browsing Internet forums in the 1990s. He sold the site in 2014 to Drew Schoentrup and Chris Richmond, who then launched a Kickstarter to overhaul the codebase and design.

Initially focused on the TV series Buffy the Vampire Slayer, TV Tropes has since expanded their coverage of many forms of media, including fan fiction. It renders many other subjects, including Internet works such as Wikipedia (often referred to in a tongue-in-cheek way as "The Other Wiki"). Articles on the site often relate to real life or point out real situations where certain tropes are applied. It has used its informal style to describe topics such as science, philosophy, politics, and history under its Useful Notes section. TV Tropes does not have notability standards for the works it covers. It also can be used for recommending lesser-known media on the "Needs More Love" page.

In October 2010, in what the site refers to as "The Google Incident", Google temporarily withdrew its AdSense service from the site after determining that pages regarding adult and mature tropes were inconsistent with its terms of service.  The site separated NSFG articles (Not Safe for Google) from SFG articles (Safe for Google) in order to allow discussion of these kinds of tropes.

In a separate incident in 2012, in response to other complaints by Google, TV Tropes changed its guidelines to restrict coverage of sexist tropes and rape tropes. Feminist blog The Mary Sue criticized this decision, as it censored documentation of sexist tropes in video games and young adult fiction. ThinkProgress additionally condemned Google AdSense itself for "providing a financial disincentive to discuss" such topics. Pornographic tropes and works, as well as additional content deemed inappropriate for coverage, were also removed from the site following the incident.

Reception
In an interview with TV Tropes co-founder Fast Eddie, Gawker Media's blog io9 described the tone of contributions to the site as "often light and funny". Cyberpunk author Bruce Sterling once described its style as a "wry fanfic analysis". Essayist Linda Börzsei described TV Tropes as a technological continuum of classical archetypal literary criticisms, capable of deconstructing recurring elements from creative works in an ironic fashion. Economist Robin Hanson, inspired by a scholarly analysis of Victorian literature, suggests TV Tropes offers a veritable treasure trove of information about fiction – a prime opportunity for research into its nature. In Lifehacker, Nick Douglas compared TV Tropes to Wikipedia, recommending to "use [TV Tropes] when Wikipedia feels impenetrable, when you want opinions more than facts, or when you've finished a Wikipedia page and now you want the juicy parts, the hard-to-confirm bits that Wikipedia doesn't share." Writing for The Believer, Chantel Tattolli commented that "It is deeply satisfying to go there and reckon with the patterns made over time, across culture, medium, and genre—and to catch them in rotation."

In the book Media After Deleuze, authors David Savat and Tauel Harper say that while TV Tropes does offer a "wonderful archeology of storytelling", the site undermines creativity and experience by attempting to "classify and represent" every part of a work.

See also
Archetypal literary criticism
Archetype
Meme
Monomyth
Motif-Index of Folk-Literature
Television criticism

References

External links
 

2004 establishments in the United States
American film websites
Creative Commons-licensed websites
Internet properties established in 2004
Narratology
Television websites
Tropes
Wiki communities